"Pilot" is a science fiction short story by British  science fiction author Stephen Baxter, part of his Xeelee Sequence.  Sixth in the anthology Vacuum Diagrams, it is a revision of a story first published as a chapbook by Novacon in 1993.

Set in AD 4874, "Pilot" relates the forced settlement of space pilots on the centaur-type planetoid Chiron and their use of their grounded ships' drives to escape the gravitational pull of the Solar System, as well as an alien missile that is sent to destroy their new home.

1993 short stories
Fiction set on centaurs (small Solar System bodies)
Short stories by Stephen Baxter